Hupa (Yurok language term: Huep'oola' / Huep'oolaa = "Hupa people") are a Native American people of the Athabaskan-speaking ethnolinguistic group in northwestern California. Their endonym is Natinixwe, also spelled Natinook-wa, meaning "People of the Place Where the Trails Return". The Karuk name was Kishákeevar / Kishakeevra ("Hupa (Trinity River) People", from kishákeevar-sav = "Hupa River, i.e. Trinity River"). The majority of the tribe is enrolled in the federally recognized Hoopa Valley Tribe.

History

Hupa people migrated from the north into northern California around 1000 CE and settled in Hoopa Valley, California (Hupa: Natinook). Their heritage language is Hupa, which is a member of the Athabaskan language family. Their land stretched from the South Fork of the Trinity River to Hoopa Valley, to the Klamath River in California. Their red cedar-planked houses, dugout canoes, basket hats, and many elements of their oral literature identify them with their northern origin; however, some of their customs, such as the use of a sweat house for ceremonies and the manufacture of acorn bread, were adopted from surrounding indigenous peoples of California. Close associated peoples - both by language and custom - were/are the Tsnungwe (South Fork Hupa), the Chilula (Lower Redwood Creek Hupa) and Whilkut (Redwood Creek Hupa).

Hupa people had limited contact with non-native peoples until the 1849 Gold Rush brought an influx of miners onto their lands. In 1864, the United States government signed a treaty that recognized the Hupa tribe's sovereignty to their land. The United States called the reservation the Hoopa Valley Indian Reservation (located at ), where Hupa people now reside, one of very few California tribes not forced from their homeland. The reservation is next to the territory of the Yurok at the connection of the Klamath and Trinity Rivers in northeastern Humboldt County.

Hupa are involved in the talks to remove hydroelectric dams along the Klamath and Trinity rivers, and were a party to a lawsuit against the Bureau of Reclamation and the National Marine Fisheries Service. On February 8, 2017 the federal district court judge ruled in favor of the Hoopa Valley Tribe, the three other Klamath River fishing tribes, and other stakeholders. The judge agreed to plans designed by the Tribes' scientists to reduce outbreaks of a deadly fish disease that had infected 90% of juvenile salmon in 2014 and 2015.

Culture

Arts
Hupa people have been excelling at basketry and elk horn carving since the 17th century, petroglyphs.

Ethnobotany
Traditionally, Hupa people have used the acorns of Notholithocarpus densiflorus to make meal, from which they would make mush, bread, biscuits, pancakes, and cakes. They also roast the acorns and eat them. They also use the dyed fronds of Woodwardia radicans for basketry. They also use Xerophyllum tenax to create a border pattern in baskets.

Fishing

Hupa, like many tribes in the area, fish for salmon in the Klamath and Trinity rivers. One of the methods they once used to capture fish was the fish weir, which tribal members would maintain. Hupa share all of their fishing practices with the neighboring Yurok Tribe. Hupa tribal fishers and their families rely on the Spring and Fall Chinook Salmon runs. Acorns, once abundant, were a main staple until they grew scarce. Because Hupa were not located as close to the sea as their neighboring Yurok Tribe, they traded supplies with them, such as salt in exchange for baskets, or acorns for canoes.

Population

Estimates for the pre-contact populations of most native groups in California have varied substantially. Alfred L. Kroeber thought that the 1770 population of Hupa was 1,000 and that Chilula and Whilkut accounted for another 1,000. Kroeber estimated the population of Hupa in 1910 as 500. In 1943, Sherburne F. Cook proposed an aboriginal population of 1,000 for Hupa and 600 for Chilula. He subsequently suggested a population for Hupa alone of 2,900. William J. Wallace felt that the latter estimate was "much too high", and allowed 1,000 for Hupa, 500–600 for Chilula, and 500 for Whilkut. The Hoopa Valley Indian Reservation has a resident population of 2,633 persons according to the 2000 census.

Reservations

Hupa descendants have since been incorporated mainly into the Hoopa Valley Indian Reservation and another tribes: 

 Hoopa Valley Tribe (Hoopa, Humboldt County, Population 2013: 3,139) (Hupa, Tsnungwe, Chimalakwe, Chilula, Whilkut)
 Cher-Ae Heights Indian Community of the Trinidad Rancheria (Trinidad, Humboldt County, Population 2011: 154) (Yurok, Wiyot, Tolowa sowie Chetco, Hupa und Karuk)
 Blue Lake Rancheria (Blue Lake, Humboldt County, Population 2010: 58) (Wiyot, Yurok, Hupa, Whilkut)

See also
 Hoopa, California—the name for the town (Unincorporated community) in the Hupa Valley. The name was changed at various times related to the post office.

References

Sources

Bibliographies 
 Hupa Bibliography, from California Indian Library Collections Project

External links
 
 
 San Francisco State University - Hupa

 
Bald Hills War
Federally recognized tribes in the United States
Native American tribes in California